Coral Astrid Bistuer Ruiz (born 16 November 1966) is a Spanish taekwondo practitioner. 

She won a gold medal in welterweight at the 1987 World Taekwondo Championships in Barcelona. She won a silver medal in welterweight at the 1991 World Taekwondo Championships in Athens. Her achievements at the European Taekwondo Championships include gold medals in 1982, 1986, 1988, 1990 and 1992.

Bistuer went on to teach taekwondo at the SEK International School El Castillo in Madrid. In 2021, she was appointed as general director of sports for the Community of Madrid.

References

External links

1966 births
Living people
Spanish female taekwondo practitioners
European Taekwondo Championships medalists
World Taekwondo Championships medalists
20th-century Spanish women
21st-century Spanish women